Kahrizak (Persian:بخش کهریزک) is a city in Kahrizak District of Ray County, Tehran province, Iran. At the 2006 census, its population was 8,704 in 2,178 households. The following census in 2011 counted 13,095 people in 2,925 households. The latest census in 2016 showed a population of 37,527 people in 10,701 households.

The city is known as one of the oldest residential areas in Iran. There are few historical monuments in Kahrizak from its ancient history, A part of the buildings of the sugar factory and two summer residences of Fakhr al-Doleh Qajar are still standing.

See also
Kahrizak detention center

References 

Ray County, Iran

Cities in Tehran Province

Populated places in Tehran Province

Populated places in Ray County, Iran